Boerhavia triquetra, with the common names creeping sticky stem, slender spiderling, spiderling,  is an annual desert plant in the four o'clock family (Nyctaginaceae).

It is native to California and Arizona, in habitats of the Mojave Desert and Sonoran Desert.

External links
Calflora Database: Boerhavia triquetra (Creeping sticky stem,  Slender spiderling)

triquetra
Flora of the California desert regions
Flora of Arizona
Flora of the Sonoran Deserts
Natural history of the Colorado Desert
Natural history of the Mojave Desert
Taxa named by Sereno Watson
Flora without expected TNC conservation status